The Advanced Learning and Research Institute (ALaRI), a faculty of informatics, was established in 1999 at the University of Lugano (Università della Svizzera italiana, USI) with the mission of promoting research and education in embedded systems. The Faculty of Informatics within very few years has become one of the Switzerland major destinations for teaching and research, ranking third after the two Federal Institutes of Technology, Zurich and Lausanne.

ALaRI offers the unique opportunity to obtain a master's degree in Cyber-Physical and Embedded Systems in cooperation with Politecnico di Milano and Federal Institute of Technology in Zurich (ETHZ). This newly designed master program is among the first in the world addressing the fast growing area of cyber-physical and embedded systems, i.e., systems and "hidden" computational devices directly interacting with the physical world. Just looking around we discover that cyber-physical and embedded systems are present at home, at work, in the environment itself, by providing the backbone technologies to design smart homes, buildings and cities, enable the internet of things, support smart energy production, management and metering, facilitate smart transportation and healthcare - and this is only a preliminary and very concise list! As an immediate consequence, the related industrial field is continuously growing with annual revenue in the order of trillion euros.

Master of Science in Cyber-Physical and Embedded Systems 
The Master of Science in Cyber-Physical and Embedded Systems offers exclusive challenging opportunities to application designers and system developers, by integrating different areas such as microelectronics, physical modeling, computer science, machine learning, telecommunication and control, and focusing on the most advanced applications.

Meeting the real need for an interdisciplinary approach, the teaching plan equips talented students with a unique body of knowledge in the area of cyber-physical and embedded systems. The educational model focuses on a system-level methodological perspective as well as on the development of interpersonal skills proven to be indispensable in today's industry, such as teamwork, marketing and management strategies. ALaRI research activities focus on topics of great scientific interest and industrial applicability, based on real-life design methodologies taking into account system properties such as performance, dependability, intelligence, security and energy efficiency.

The program, designed for students holding a bachelor's degree in Computer Science, Computer Engineering and, more in general, in the domain of Information and Communication Technologies is built around three major methodological pillars: the interaction with the physical world, the embedded (networked) system, and the embedded applications. Courses, integrated to provide a holistic picture of the diversified facets, are given by world renowned, award-winning professors and industrial leaders.

Both modular intensive and regular, semester-long courses are offered so that technological awareness, competences and problem solving abilities are built and developed together, within the same framework. These are the profiles and qualifications that industry and research are looking for. Classroom education is naturally complemented by hands-on laboratory experience so that methodological aspects are reflected in real-world environment. This approach has proven to be effective and successful, as endorsed by dozens of ALaRI Alumni, as it naturally facilitates the assimilation of deep technical concepts and core competences immediately usable in industry and academia.

The study program of the Master of Science in Cyber-Physical and Embedded Systems consists of four full-time study semesters (120 ECTS over two years). The thesis starts during the third semester and completes by the end of the fourth. Each individual student is assisted in tailoring the teaching plan to his/her previous competences and specific interests. To broaden the student's perspective, up to 18 ECTS can be obtained with elective courses chosen from the program.

Compulsory Courses 
 Introduction to CPS & ES Overview of CPS and ES; Sensors; Actuators; Principles of metrology; Microcontrollers; Networking; Real time; Lab: on Arduino.
 Physical Modelling Mathematics for CPS: Linear algebra (recalls); Probability and statistics (recalls); ODE; Fourier series & transforms; DFT and FFT; Sampling theorem; Laplace transforms; Zeta transforms; Modelling the physical world: continuous and time discrete systems; Dynamics (constant of time and stability); Discretization methods; From theory to practice: modeling examples taken from electrical and physical systems.
 Microelectronics Integrated Circuits; Layout design; Design of CMOS cells; From gate to arithmetic circuit and register file; Low power design at the CMOS level; Design of MEMS sensors; Lab: cell design.
 Embedded Systems Architectures Summary of general-purpose architectures (recall). Focus on the ARM architecture; The coprocessor concept; Multiprocessor fundamentals; GPU architectures: basics, programming approaches. Lab on ARM with interrupt handling and design of a device driver.
 Software Engineering Principles of software engineering (for embedded systems); Requirements engineering; Testing, inspection and documentation; Software product lines; Component-based development; Software quality assurance; Software maintenance.
 Digital Signal Processing Linear filters; Design of IIR and FIR; Filter banks; Adaptive filters (LMS); Lab: Applications on filters; Moving a numerical computation to a DSP. 
 Project Management & Leadership	Project management; series of individual lectures delivered by recognized lectures.
 Nanosystems: Devices and design The synthesis and place-and-route chain; Nanosystems: Systems-on-Chip and Labs-on-Chip; Biosensors and nanosensors; Lab: hands on the design of a nanosystem (using VHDL and state-of-the art tools).
 Heterogeneous multicore architectures Design of heterogeneous multicore architectures; The Network-on-Chip concept; Architectural support to parallel execution; self-adaptation; Power management; Communication mechanisms; Management of multicore heterogeneous architectures.
 RT Systems OS (recalls); Tasks & threads (recalls); HW & SW I/O (recalls); Real-time computing; Real-time scheduling; Real-time kernels; Lab: hands on real-time systems.
 CPS Intelligence Dependability and Reliability; Fault detection, diagnosis and recovery; Coding techniques; Adaptation mechanisms in ES; Learning in a nonstationary environments; Cognitive fault diagnosis for CPS; Lab: adaptation and reliability in CPS.
 Cyber Communication Communication technologies and protocols for wired networks (e.g., CAN bus, Ethernet, USB, optical communication) and wireless networks (e.g., ZigBee, NFC, bluetooth, Wi-Fi). Lab: hands on selected technologies, e.g., Canbus and Zigbee.
 Digital Automation Controllers & stability issues; Design of discrete-time controllers; Lab:design a full controlled CPS system (if possible an experience in mechatronics).
 Reprogrammable Systems Advanced VHDL; Reprogrammable systems; FPGAs with complex blocks (processors, DSP); Radiation hard FPGAs; Reconfigurable FPGAs; Lab: hands on reconfigurable FPGAs.  
 Specification Languages From application requirements to specifications; Models and techniques for system level specification; A top-down approach for specification refinement; Behavioural impact and cost of incomplete specifications; Lab: System C, from behavioral to RTL.
 Optimizing Embedded Applications Deterministic Vs.  probabilistic approaches for complexity management; Randomized algorithms; Evolutionary optimization; Application porting to low precision platforms; Robustness analysis; Techniques for performance assessment at the application level.
 Multicore embedded applications design Strategies for designing a multicore application; Regular vs. irregular applications. Lab on heterogeneous multicore architectures (with GPUs). 
 Physical computing Application design and integration of distributed embedded devices; Focus on short-range wireless networking; Mobile interfaces and embedded sensing; Remote sensing; Lab on the Arduino board.
 Cyber-security Introduction to cryptography; Symmetric and asymmetric algorithms; Key exchange; Digital signatures; HW & SW implementations.
 Validation and Verification Formal analysis for hardware & Sw validation.
 Trends and threats in Cyber-security Side-channels attacks; Malware; Quantum-security; Post-quantum algorithms; Hardware Trojans: Lab on breaking a secure device; Malware design.
 Intelligent systems Supervised and unsupervised learning; Features extraction and selection; Recurrent networks (RC, ESN); Convolutional neural Networks; Deep learning; Classification and regression real-world problems. 
 Mobile Computing Data collection using mobile phones; Local and remote storage of sensor data (also on the cloud); Location sensing and estimation; User interfaces; Lab: hands on the design of a mobile applications with Android.

Elective Courses 
 Business  & Entrepreneurship Business idea and Business plan, Business strategies, Product and price, Market communication, Sales and distributions, patent and protection of IPs.
 HW/SW Codesign HW/SW Codesign, lab on zynq board or on a softcore in FPGA.
 Future trends in computer architectures Superscalar, Vector, Multi-thread and multicore processors; future trends.
 Low -Power Design HW: Frequency and voltage scaling; power consumption minimization; tools for power optimization. Energy vs Power optimization. SW vs HW power optimization. SW: Sw strategies for designing energy aware applications.
 Human-Computer Interaction User-Centered Design Methodologies, Interfaces and Information Visualization Systems, Mobile App Design, Digital Fabrication.
 Trends and threats in Cyber-security Side-channels attacks; Malware; Quantum-security; Post-quantum algorithms, Hardware Trojans: Lab on breaking a device and on designing malware.
 Intelligent systems
 Mobile Computing

References

External links 

 ALaRI homepage
 IEEE Student Branch

University of Lugano
Research institutes in Switzerland
Schools in the canton of Ticino
Research institutes established in 1999
1999 establishments in Switzerland